R-410A, sold under the trademarked names AZ-20, EcoFluor R410, Forane 410A, Genetron R410A, Puron, and Suva 410A, is a zeotropic but near-azeotropic mixture of difluoromethane (CH2F2, called R-32) and pentafluoroethane (CHF2CF3, called R-125) that is used as a refrigerant in air conditioning and heat pump applications. R-410A cylinders were colored rose but are no longer specially color-coded, now bearing a standard light gray color.

On December 27, 2020, the United States Congress passed the American Innovation and Manufacturing (AIM) Act, which directs US Environmental Protection Agency (EPA) to phase down production and consumption hydrofluorocarbons (HFCs). HFCs have a high global warming potential and contribute to climate change. Rules developed under the AIM Act require HFC production and consumption to be reduced by 85% from 2022 to 2036. R-410A will be restricted by this Act because it contains the HFC R-125. Other refrigerants (like R-32 and R-454B) will replace R-410A in most applications, just as R-410A replaced the earlier refrigerant, R-22.

History
R-410A was invented and patented by Allied Signal (now Honeywell) in 1991. Other producers around the world have been licensed to manufacture and sell R-410A, but Honeywell continues to be the leader in capacity and sales. R-410A was successfully commercialized in the air conditioning segment by a combined effort of Carrier Corporation, Emerson Climate Technologies, Inc., Copeland Scroll Compressors (a division of Emerson Electric Company), and Allied Signal. Carrier Corporation was the first company to introduce an R-410A-based residential air conditioning unit into the market in 1996 and holds the trademark "Puron".

Transition from R-22 to R-410A
R-410A replaced R-22 as the preferred refrigerant for use in residential and commercial air conditioners in Japan, Europe, and the United States.

Parts designed specifically for R-410A must be used, as R-410A operates at higher pressures than other refrigerants. R-410A systems thus require service personnel to use different tools, equipment, safety standards, and techniques. Equipment manufacturers are aware of these changes and require the certification of professionals installing R-410A systems. In addition, the AC&R Safety Coalition has been created to help educate professionals about R-410A systems.

R-22 Phaseout
In accordance with terms and agreement reached in the Montreal Protocol (The Montreal Protocol on Substances That Deplete the Ozone Layer), the United States Environmental Protection Agency has mandated that production or import of R-22 along with other hydrochlorofluorocarbons (HCFCs) be phased out in the United States. In the E.U. and the U.S., R-22 cannot be used in the manufacture of new air conditioning or similar units from 1 January 2010. In other parts of the world, the phase-out date varies from country to country. All newly manufactured window air conditioners and mini split air conditioners in the United States come with R-410A. Since 1 January 2020, the production and importation of R-22 has been banned; the only available sources of R-22 include that which has been stockpiled or recovered from existing devices.

R-410A use expanded globally and rapidly as it replaced R-22.

Environmental effects

Unlike alkyl halide refrigerants that contain bromine or chlorine, R-410A (which contains only fluorine) does not contribute to ozone depletion and is therefore becoming more widely used as ozone-depleting refrigerants like R-22 are phased out. However, like methane, its global warming potential (GWP) is appreciably worse than CO2 for the time it persists. Because R410A is a 50% combination of CH2F2 (HFC-32) and 50% CHF2CF3 (HFC-125), it is not easy to express their combined effects in a single global warming potential (GWP), However, HFC-32 has a 4.9 year lifetime and a 100-year GWP of 675 and HFC-125 has a 29-year lifetime and a 100-year GWP of 3500. The combination has a GWP of 2088, higher than that of R-22 (100-year GWP=1810), and an atmospheric lifetime of nearly 30 years compared with the 12-year lifetime of R-22.

Since R-410A allows for higher SEER ratings than an R-22 system by reducing power consumption, the overall impact on global warming of R-410A systems can, in some cases, be lower than that of R-22 systems due to reduced greenhouse gas emissions from power plants. This assumes that the atmospheric leakage will be sufficiently managed. Under the assumption that preventing ozone depletion is more important in the short term than GWP reduction, R-410A is preferable to R-22.

R-410A Phaseout
The phase-down mandated by the AIM Act will lead to R-410A's replacement by other refrigerants beginning in 2022. Alternative refrigerants are available, including hydrofluoroolefins, hydrocarbons (such as propane R-290 and isobutane R-600A), and even carbon dioxide (R-744, GWP = 1). The alternative refrigerants have much lower GWP than R-410A.

Physical properties 

Thermophysical properties - Properties of refrigerant R410a

Precaution 
R-410A cannot be used in R-22 service equipment because of higher operating pressures (approximately 40 to 70% higher).

While R-410A has negligible fractionation potential, it cannot be ignored when charging.

To avoid fractionation as the system is charged and for optimum system performance, the correct procedure must be used, depending on the type of cylinder.  If a cylinder with dip-tubes is used, R-410A can be charged while the cylinder is upright.  If the cylinder doesn't have dip-tubes, it should be kept upside-down to charge with liquid, not vapor, from the cylinder.  The procedure, then, is to fill very slowly, the valve restricting output, in order to avoid slugging the compressor with liquid.

Trade names 
 Suva 410A (DuPont)
 Puron (Carrier)
 Genetron AZ-20 (Honeywell)

References 

Refrigerants
Greenhouse gases
Daikin